Mumu is a 1959 Soviet drama film directed by Anatoliy Bobrovskiy and Evgeniy Teterin.

Plot 
The film tells about the dumb serf and his faithful dog MuMu.

Cast 
 Afanasi Kochetkov as Gerasim
 Nina Grebeshkova as Tatyana
 Yelena Polevitskaya as The Mistress
 Igor Bezyayev as Kapiton
 Ivan Ryzhov as Gavrila
 Evgeniy Teterin as Khariton
 Leonid Kmit as Stepan
 Varvara Myasnikova as Lyubimovna
 Aleksandra Denisova as Housekeeper
 Aleksandra Fyodorova as Ustinya

References

External links 
 

1959 films
1950s Russian-language films
Soviet drama films
1959 drama films